AD 2 (II) or 2 AD was a common year starting on Sunday or Monday (the link will display the full calendar) of the Julian calendar (the sources differ, see leap year error for further information) and a common year starting on Sunday of the proleptic Julian calendar. In the Roman Empire, it was known as the Year of the Consulship of Vinicius and Varus, named after Roman consuls Publius Vinicius and Alfenus Varus, and less frequently, as year 755 AUC (ab urbe condita) within the Roman Empire. The denomination "AD 2" for this year has been used since the early medieval period, when the Anno Domini calendar era became the prevalent method in Europe for naming years.

Events

By place

Roman Empire 
 Following the death of Lucius Caesar, Livia Drusilla persuades Augustus to allow her son Tiberius back into Rome as a private citizen, after six years of enforced retirement on Rhodes.
 Gaius Caesar meets with Phraates V, the king of Parthia, on the Euphrates.  Rather than invade the Parthians, Gaius Caesar concludes peace with them; Parthia recognizes Roman claims to Armenia.

Africa 
 Juba II of Mauretania joins Gaius Caesar in Armenia as a military advisor. It is during this period that he meets Glaphyra, a Cappadocian princess and the former wife of Alexandros of Judea, a brother of Herod Archelaus, ethnarch of Judea, and becomes enamoured with her.

China 
 Wang Mang begins a program of personal aggrandizement, restoring marquess titles to past imperial princes and introducing a pension system for retired officials. Restrictions are placed on the Emperor's mother, Consort Wei and members of the Wei Clan.
 The first census is concluded in China after having begun the year before: final numbers show a population of nearly 60 million (59,594,978 people in slightly more than 12 million households). The census is one of the most accurate surveys in Chinese history.

Births 
 Deng Yu, Chinese general and statesman (d. AD 58)

Deaths 
 August 20 – Lucius Caesar, son of Marcus Vipsanius Agrippa and Julia the Elder (b. 17 BC)
 Gaius Marcius Censorinus, Roman consul (approximate date)

See also 
 Ab urbe condita

References

Sources 

 

 

als:0er#Johr 2